Koh Chun-son (born 2 June 1952) is a North Korean long-distance runner. He competed in the marathon at the 1976 Summer Olympics and the 1980 Summer Olympics.

References

1952 births
Living people
Athletes (track and field) at the 1976 Summer Olympics
Athletes (track and field) at the 1980 Summer Olympics
North Korean male long-distance runners
North Korean male marathon runners
Olympic athletes of North Korea
Place of birth missing (living people)
Asian Games medalists in athletics (track and field)
Asian Games bronze medalists for North Korea
Athletes (track and field) at the 1978 Asian Games
Medalists at the 1978 Asian Games
20th-century North Korean people